Aly Zaker (6 November 1944 – 27 November 2020) was a Bangladeshi actor, businessman, director and writer. He was the owner of Asiatic Marketing Communications Limited (Asiatic 3 Sixty).

Zaker served as a freedom fighter during the 1971 Bangladesh Liberation War. He was one of the trustees of Liberation War Museum in Dhaka.

In 1999 Zakar was awarded the prestigious Ekushey Padak award by the Government of Bangladesh, which is the second highest civilian award in Bangladesh.

Aly Zaker, who had cancer, died at Dhaka's United Hospital at 6:45am on 27 November 2020. He was being treated for COVID-19.

Background and early life
Zaker was born in Chittagong. He spent his childhood in Kushtia. Among four siblings he is the third of his parents – Muhammad Taher and Rezia Taher. Muhammad Taher was a high ranked government official (District Magistrate). He experienced the diversity of life living in different places since his early childhood as his father was in a transferable government job. He spent his early childhood in the district of Kushtia and Madaripur. Later they moved to Khulna and lived there for couple of years until they moved to Dhaka.

Personal life
Zaker was married to Sara Zaker who is also a media personality, entrepreneur, and social activist. Together they had two children – Iresh Zaker and Sriya Sharbojoya. Both Iresh and Sriya are working in Asiatic Marketing Communications Limited as executive director and brand communication manager respectively. While Sara Zaker is the deputy managing director of the company.

Professional life

Acting 
Zaker was famed for his theatre acting, with his career spanning many decades. He was founding member of the theatre group, Nagorik where he worked alongside his wife Sara Zaker and the celebrated actor and politician Asaduzzaman Noor since the 1970s.

In 2018 Zakar played the leading role in a Bangla adaptation of Bertolt Brecht's 1943 play The Life of Galileo. Zakar played the role of the 17th Century polymath, Galileo Galilei, alongside Asaduzzaman Noor, who played a number of supporting roles. The play ran for a limited number of performances in Dhaka's Bailey Road.

Business 
Zaker was the group chairman of Asiatic 3Sixty, an advertising agency in Bangladesh. It includes Asiatic Marketing Communications Ltd, Talkingpoint, MEC (media agency), Maxus, Asiatic Mindshare, ForthoughtPR, Dhoni Chitra Ltd, 20 Miles, Nayantara Communications, Asiatic Events Ltd, Moitree Printers Ltd., MRC-Mode Ltd.

Work
Television drama
 Pathar Shomoy
 Bohubrihi
 Aaj Robibar
 Nitu Tomaye Bhalobasi
 Ekdin Hothat
 Nokkhotrer Raat (Guest Appearance)

Theatre 
 Dewan Gazir Kissa
 Acholayatan
 Chhayanaut
 Kanthal Bagan (Cherry Orchard)

Films
 Agami (1984)
 Nodir Naam Modhumoti (1996)
 "Brishtee"
 Rabeya (2008)

Awards
 Ekushey Padak (1999)
 Selim Al-Deen Padak (2017)
 Shaheed Altaf Mahmud Padak (2017)
 Meril Prothom Alo Awards (2018)

References

1944 births
2020 deaths
Bangladeshi male television actors
Bangladeshi theatre directors
Bangladeshi male film actors
Bangladeshi male stage actors
20th-century Bangladeshi male actors
Recipients of the Ekushey Padak in arts
Notre Dame College, Dhaka alumni
Meril-Prothom Alo Lifetime Achievement Award winners
Deaths from the COVID-19 pandemic in Bangladesh
University of Dhaka alumni
21st-century Bangladeshi male actors
Bangladeshi radio personalities
People of the Bangladesh Liberation War
20th-century Bengalis
21st-century Bengalis
St. Gregory's High School and College alumni